Kemptville is a community located in North Grenville in Ontario, Canada. It can also refer to:
 Kemptville, Nova Scotia
 East Kemptville, Nova Scotia
 North Kemptville, Nova Scotia
 Kemptville Creek, a stream in eastern Ontario, Canada